Morgane Polanski (born 20 January 1993) is a French-Polish actress, best known for portraying Princess Gisla in the History Channel series Vikings.

Early life and education 
Polanski is the daughter of Polish filmmaker Roman Polanski and French actress Emmanuelle Seigner. She has a younger brother, Elvis. Polanski was raised bilingually in French and Polish.

Polanski was educated at the International School of Paris. She later studied acting at the Drama Centre London and the Central School of Speech and Drama, graduating in 2014.

Career 
Polanski made her credited acting debut in her father's 2002 film The Pianist. She appeared in two more of his films, Oliver Twist (2005) and The Ghost Writer (2010), in the latter of which she had her first speaking role.

In 2015, Polanski appeared in the British independent film Unhallowed Ground and began portraying Princess Gisla in the History Channel series Vikings. Princess Gisla was introduced in season three of Vikings as a daughter of the French Emperor Charles the Bald (while a legendary French princess named Gisela was the daughter of his grandson, Charles the Simple).

She directed the shorts The Stroke (2016) and The Understudy (2018), the former of which she also wrote.

In 2019, Polanski starred in Rene van Pannevis debut feature Looted. Pannevis stated, "I hadn't worked with Morgane before so she was a bit lost after her first scene. Thankfully, she picked it up very quickly and her performance is beautiful. I mean, growing up in that environment, I knew she had the skills".

In February 2020, it was announced that Polanski will appear in the Wes Anderson's new film The French Dispatch.

It was revealed that Polanski will return to her role as Princess Gisla and make an appearance in season six (part two) of the Vikings, which aired at the end of 2020.

In 2021, Morgane Polanski directed Dame Siân Phillips in Through the Looking Glass short film, which was screening at Venice Film Festival. Polanski stated, "When I find a project and I know in my gut I need to direct it, I feel no fear. I know how I want to interpret it, what point of view I want to adopt, how I want the colors, the tone. I didn't have any insecurities about approaching Dame Sian's agent and sending her the script. I wanted to recreate that feeling of a fairytale, Snow White with her lips as red as blood; the talking mirror. Sunset Boulevard was also on our mood board. The idea was that the production should have a feel of heightened femininity that's OTT, fantastical".

Filmography

References

Further reading 
 Vogue article (in French)
 W article

External links 
 

1993 births
21st-century French actresses
Actresses from Paris
Alumni of the Royal Central School of Speech and Drama
Alumni of the Drama Centre London
French female models
French film actresses
French people of Polish-Jewish descent
French television actresses
Living people